Sonja and the Bull is a 2012 Croatian comedy film directed by Vlatka Vorkapić.

Plot
Animal rights activist Sonja and insurance broker Ante (Goran Bogdan) come from very different backgrounds.

Sonja speaks against bull wrestling on TV, which angers some families in Ante's village, which has a tradition of bull wrestling.

Stipe (Dejan Aćimović) bets that Sonja will not dare to come close to Garonja, his beloved bull. Ante is sent to Zagreb to bring Sonja to the village. Using his persuasive talents he succeeds. When the moment comes to face the bull Sonja shows a lot of courage.

Cast 
 Judita Franković - Sonja Sterle
 Goran Bogdan - Ante Kevo
 Ivo Gregurević - Ante's father
 Csilla Barath Bastaić - Nika Pofuk
 Dejan Aćimović - Stipe
 Vladimir Tintor - Davor

References

 Debitantska komedija Vlatke Vorkapić: 'Brz i duhovit film dobrih gegova, ali romansa mu je najslabija točka'

External links 

2012 comedy films
2012 films
Croatian comedy films
2010s Croatian-language films